Manuel Vázquez Gallego (1930 in Madrid – 1995 in Barcelona), was a Spanish cartoonist. He was one of the most important artists of Editorial Bruguera.

His family were friends with comedians Wenceslao Fernández Flórez and Enrique Jardiel Poncela, who influenced Vázquez's humor.

Vázquez started to publish in the 1940s in a new magazine. He started to publish in Editorial Bruguera in 1947. He created a lot of characters, for example: Las hermanas Gilda (The Gilda Sisters) (The adventures of two very different sisters), Anacleto, agente secreto (Anacleto, Secret Agent) (A surrealist parody of James Bond), La familia Cebolleta (The Scallion Family) or El tío Vázquez (Uncle Vázquez) (A self- parody)

When Editorial Bruguera disappeared he also joined in adult magazines such as El Papus or Makoki with the alias Sappo. Vázquez died in 1995.

The character of the rooftop debtor in the cartoon  was based on Vázquez by Francisco Ibáñez. 
Ibáñez considered Vázquez the most agile cartoonist, the funniest in Spanish comics.

There is a 2010 biopic film based on his life called El gran Vázquez directed by Óscar Aibar and starring Santiago Segura.

Bibliography

Albums of Manuel Vázquez 

Macana en el Oeste, Ed. Hispano Americana, Col. "Infantil de las Grandes Aventuras", Barcelona, 1946.
La fuga de El Caimán, Ibero-Americanas, "Cuento de Hadas", 1949.
Hermanas Gilda, Bruguera, "Magos del Lápiz" (at least two albums), Barcelona, 1949.
Las Hermanas Gilda: El tesoro maldito, Bruguera, "Magos de la Risa", nº 5, 1950.
Heliodoro: ¡Detective genial!, Bruguera, "Magos de la Risa", nº 14, 1950.
Las Hermanas Gilda: El tesoro de Buda, Bruguera, "Magos de la Risa, nº 14, 1950.
Samba: El fantasma pequeñito y el enmascarado misterioso, Hispano Americana, "Humor de Bolsillo", nº 2, 1950.
¡Ahí va ese loco!, Hispano Americana, "Humor de Bolsillo", nº 6, 1950.
Cápsula Bill, aventurero del Oeste, Hispano Americana, "Humor de Bolsillo", nº 9, 1950.
El tesoro de los Pies Zambos, Hispano Americana, "Humor de Bolsillo", nº 10, 1950.
La Cabaña del Tío Joe, Hispano Americana, "Humor de Bolsillo", nº 12, 1950.
Pepe Almendruco y el Pueblo Fantasma, Hispano Americana, "Humor de Bolsillo", nº 15, 1950.
El Mago de la Coz, Hispano Americana, "Humor de Bolsillo", nº 18, 1950.
Heliodoro: Un lunes en Marte, Bruguera, "Magos de la Risa", nº 19, 1951.
Anacleto, Agente Secreto, Bruguera, "Alegres Historietas", nº 7, 1971.
Anacleto: El malvado Vázquez, Bruguera, "Alegres Historietas", nº 9, 1971.
Anacleto: Misión imposible, Bruguera, "Alegres Historietas", nº 13, 1971.
La Familia Cebolleta: ¡Problemas por doquier!, Bruguera, "Olé!", nº 4, 1971.
Las Hermanas Gilda y sus locuelas peripecias, Bruguera, "Olé!", nº 9, 1971.
Anacleto, Bruguera, "Olé!", nº 12, 1971.
Los cuentos de Tío Vázquez, Bruguera, "Olé!", nº 25, 1971.
Las Hermanas Gilda: Majoretes del humor, Bruguera, "Olé!", nº 33, 1971.
Anacleto: Los encarguitos del jefe, Bruguera, "Olé!", nº41, 1971.
Anacleto ¡nunca falla!, Bruguera, "Olé", nº 49, 1972.
Los miseriosos casos de Anacleto, Bruguera, "Alegres Historietas", nº17, 1972.
Las Hermanas Gilda: Herme, la juguetona, Bruguera, "Olé!", nº 52, 1972.
Angelito: Un encanto de criatura, Bruguera, "Olé!", nº 54, 1972.
Anacleto en La sábana encantada, Bruguera, "Olé!", Mini Infancia", nº 40/157, 1972.
La Familia Cebolleta; Los apuros de Don Rosendo, Bruguera, "Olé!", nº 59, 1972.
Anacleto: Licencia para meter la pata, Bruguera, "Olé!", nº 69, 1972.
Los fantasmagóricos casos de Anacleto, Bruguera, "Alegres Historietas", nº 19, 1972.
Anacleto: casos a capazos, Bruguera, "Olé!", nº74, 1973.
El terror de los espías, Bruguera, "Alegres Historietas", nº 23, 1973.
Misión cumplida, Bruguera, "Olé!", nº 154, 1978 (presumiblemente incluye dibujos ajenos).
Don Cornelio Ladilla y su señora María, Ceres, Barcelona, 1979.
La Familia Cebolleta y otros cuentos, Bruguera, Super Humor, nº 17, 1979.
Don Cornelio Ladilla y su señora María II, Amaika, "El Papus", nº 8, Barcelona, 1981.
El sexo en la Prehistoria, Zinco, Barcelona, 1983.
Las Hermanas Gilda, Bruguera, "Genios de la Historieta", nº1, 1985.
Tita y Nic, Compañía General, "Garibolo Especial", nº2, Barcelona, 1987.
Anacleto, Bruch, "Gran Enciclopedia del Cómic", nº 1, Barcelona, 1988.
Varias historietas, Ediciones B, "Olé!", nº 12 y 25, 1989.
¡¡Vámonos al bingo!!, Ediciones B, "Tope Guai!", nº 21, 1989.
Varias historietas, Ediciones B, "Tope Guai!", nº 22, 1989.
Los casos del Inspector Yes, Ediciones B, "Tope Guai!", nº23, 1989.
Historias verdes, Makoki, "Humor Kafre", nº 1, Barcelona, 1990 (reeditado en dos tomos por Glénat España, "Genios del Humor", nº 6 y 7, Barcelona, 1997).
Sábado, sabadete, Makoki, "Álbumes Makoki", 1991.
Varias historietas, Ediciones B, "Olé!", nº 2 y 5, 1993-1994.
Gente peligrosa, Glénat España, "By Vázquez", nº 1, 1994.
Más Gente peligrosa, Glénat España, "By Vázquez", nº 2, 1994.
By Vázquez, Glénat España, 1995 (series of 6 numbers).
Las inefables aventuras de Vázquez, agente del fisco, Glénat España, "Genios del Humor", nº 2, 1997.
Las cartas sobre la mesa (3 albums: "Admirado maestro...", "Querido Sr. Vázquez..." y "Distinguido gran hombre..."), Glénat España, "Genios del Humor", nº 3, 4 y 5, 1997.

Bibliography about Vázquez 
Martínez Peñaranda, Enrique: Vázquez (El dibujante y su leyenda), Sins Entido, Madrid, 2004

References

External links 
Manuel Vázquez in Lambiek Comiclopedia

1930 births
1995 deaths
People from Madrid
Spanish comics artists
Spanish comics writers